Retilla indigens is a species of beetle in the family Cerambycidae, and the only species in the genus Retilla. It was described by Lacordaire in 1872.

References

Gyaritini
Beetles described in 1872